The DC Extended Universe (DCEU) is an American media franchise and shared universe centered on a series of superhero films and television series produced by DC Films and distributed by Warner Bros. Pictures. It is based on characters that appear in American comic books published by DC Comics. The DCEU also includes comic books, short films, novels, and video games. Much like the original DC Universe in comic books, the DCEU was established by crossing over common plot elements, settings, cast, and characters.

The franchise has won an Academy Awards, nominated for three Annie Awards, seven Critics' Choice Movie Awards (winning two), 13 Critics' Choice Super Awards (winning two), 12 Golden Raspberry (winning four), five Grammy Awards, two Hugo Awards (winning one), three Golden Reel Awards, 14 MTV Movie & TV Awards (winning two), one Primetime Creative Arts Emmy Award, 35 Saturn Awards (winning one), and eight Visual Effects Society Awards, among others.

Annie Awards

Critics' Choice Movie Awards

Critics' Choice Super Awards

Golden Raspberry

Golden Reel

MTV Movie & TV Awards

Saturn Awards

Visual Effects Society

Other

See also 
 List of accolades received by Marvel Cinematic Universe films – similar franchise

References

External links 

 
 
 
 
 
 
 
 
 
 
 
 
 

Lists of accolades by film series
Lists of accolades by franchises
Accolades